Street Road may refer to:
Pennsylvania Route 132 in Bucks County
Pennsylvania Route 926 in Chester County

See also
Stroad